Atlasov Island, known in Russian as Ostrov Atlasova (Остров Атласова), or in Japanese as Araido (阿頼度島), is the northernmost island and volcano and also the highest volcano of the Kuril islands, part of the Sakhalin Oblast in Russia. The Russian name is sometimes rendered in English as Atlasova Island. Other names for the island include Uyakhuzhach, Oyakoba and Alaid, the name of the volcano on the island.

The island is named after Vladimir Atlasov, a 17th-century Russian explorer who incorporated the nearby Kamchatka Peninsula into Russia. Numerous pyroclastic cones dot the lower flanks of basaltic to basaltic andesite volcano, particularly on the NW and SE sides, including an offshore cone formed during the 1933–34 eruption.

Its near perfect shape gave rise to many legends about the volcano among the peoples of the region, such as the Itelmens and Kuril Ainu. The Russian scientist Stepan Krasheninnikov was told the story that it was once a mountain in Kamchatka, but the neighbouring mountains became jealous of its beauty and exiled it to the sea, leaving behind Kurile Lake in southern Kamchatka. Geographically, this story is not without evidence, as after the last Ice Age most of the icecaps melted, raising the world's water level, and possibly submerging a landbridge to the volcano.
Following the transfer of the Kuril Islands to Japan by the Treaty of St Petersburg, 1875, Oyakoba as it is called by the Japanese, became the northernmost island of the empire and subject of much aesthetic praise, described in haiku, ukiyo-e, etc.
Ito Osamu (1926) described it as more exquisitely shaped than Mount Fuji.

Administratively this island belongs to the Sakhalin Oblast of the Russian Federation.

See also
 List of islands of Russia
 List of volcanoes in Russia
 List of ultras of Northeast Asia

References

External links
 The Russian Kuril Islands Expedition to Atlasov
 Sakhalin Oblast
 "Vulkan Alaid, Russia" on Peakbagger

Active volcanoes
Islands of the Sea of Okhotsk
Islands of the Russian Far East
Stratovolcanoes of Russia
Islands of the Kuril Islands
Uninhabited islands of Russia
Uninhabited islands of the Pacific Ocean
Volcanoes of the Kuril Islands
Mountains of the Kuril Islands